Cliff railway station was opened in 1840 as an original station of the Hull and Selby Railway. It was renamed Hemingbrough railway station in 1874.

The station closed in 1967.

History
Cliff railway station was opened 2 July 1840 in the village of Cliffe, Selby as an original station of the Hull and Selby Railway. The station was renamed to Hemingbrough on 1 September 1874.

The station had a small set of sidings north of the line, with an eastern line of track serving a malthouse.

Hemingbrough was the only station on the Hull and Selby line to close as a result of the Beeching report. The station closed to goods on 4 May 1964, and to passengers on 6 November 1967.

References

Sources
, (reprint)

External links

Former Hull and Selby Railway stations
Disused railway stations in North Yorkshire
Railway stations in Great Britain opened in 1840
Railway stations in Great Britain closed in 1967
Beeching closures in England